The third Women's Hockey Olympic Qualifier for the 1996 Summer Olympics in Atlanta, Georgia was held in Cape Town, South Africa, from Wednesday November 15 to Saturday November 26, 1995. Eight nations took part, and they played a round robin. The top five teams joined the other three that have already qualified: Australia, title holders Spain, and hosts the United States.

Team rosters

Mariana Arnal (gk), Verónica Artica (gk), María Camardón, Silvia Corvalán, Sofía MacKenzie, Magdalena Aicega, Julieta Castellán, Gabriela Sánchez, Anabel Gambero, Jorgelina Rimoldi, Karina Masotta, Vanina Oneto, María Castelli, Gabriela Pando, and Cecilia Rognoni. Head Coach: Rodolfo Mendoza. NB: One name missing.

Deb Whitten (gk), Tara Croxford, Laurelee Kopeck, Nicole Colaco, Lisa Faust, Amy MacFarlane, Carla Somerville, Sue Reid, Veronica Planella, Karen McNeill, Chris Hunter, Tammy Holt, Gillian Sewell, Krista Thompson. Head Coach: ??. NB: Two names missing.

Birgit Beyer (gk), Susie Wollschläger (gk), Simone Thomaschinski, Eva Hagenbäumer, Denise Klecker, Irina Kuhnt, Britta Becker, Melanie Cremer, Tanja Dickenscheid, Heike Lätzsch, Franziska Hentschel, Nadine Ernsting-Krienke, Natascha Keller, Vanessa van Kooperen, Philippa Suxdorf, and Katrin Kauschke. Head Coach: Berti Rauth.

Joanne Thompson (gk), Jill Atkins, Karen Brown, Susan Fraser, Lucy Cope, Mandy Davies, Pauline Robertson, Tammy Miller, Jane Sixsmith, Susan MacDonald, Anna Bennett, Hilary Rose (gk), Rhona Simpson, Mandy Nicholls, Diana Renilson, and Christine Cook. Head Coach: Sue Slocombe.

Jacqueline Toxopeus (gk), Stella de Heij (gk), Willemijn Duyster, Wendy Fortuin, Noor Holsboer, Marlies Vossen, Dillianne van den Boogaard, Suzanne Plesman, Jeannette Lewin, Suzan van der Wielen, Florentine Steenberghe, Margje Teeuwen, Nicole Koolen, Mijntje Donners, Ellen Kuipers, and Wietske de Ruiter. Head Coach: Tom van 't Hek.

Caryn Bentley, Paulene de Bruin, Jill Dix (gk), C Mangion (gk),  Jacqui Geyser, Nicky du Toit (gk), Sherylle Calder, Gill Daniels, Hanneli Arnoldi, Michele MacNaughton, Caroline Matthews, Karen Roberts, Lindsey Carlisle, Sharon Cormack, Karen Symons, Kerry Bee, and Alison Dare. Head Coach: Kelly Fairweather. (field hockey)|

Match results

Final standings

Remarks
 The first five (South Korea, Great Britain, Germany, Argentina and the Netherlands) qualified for the 1996 Summer Olympics in Atlanta, Georgia.

Top scorers

See also
1996 Men's Field Hockey Olympic Qualifier

References
 Overview on FIH-site

Q
Field hockey
International women's field hockey competitions hosted by South Africa
1995W
Field hockey at the 1996 Summer Olympics
Qualification for the 1996 Summer Olympics
November 1995 sports events in Africa
1990s in Cape Town
Sports competitions in Cape Town
1995 in South African women's sport